Fort Cox or Cox's Fort was a French and Indian War stockade at the mouth of the Little Cacapon River on the Potomac River near Little Cacapon in Hampshire County, West Virginia.

History 
Prior to receiving his land grant from Lord Fairfax, Stoker had also purchased  from John Cox. Located on these lands at the Little Cacapon's mouth was "Coxes Ferry," which crossed the Potomac to Maryland. It was at the river's mouth (referred to as "Ferry Field") that a relative of John Cox, Friend Cox, had constructed a stockade. Cox's Fort was erected prior to 1750 for the purposes of protecting and defending both the Potomac River and the Little Cacapon valley. Cox's fort and ferry later served as a means of transportation for General Edward Braddock and his soldiers en route to Cumberland from Winchester during the French and Indian War.

References

Cox
Landmarks in West Virginia
Cox
Cox